Pulak Roy is an Indian politician and the Minister of Public Health Engineering in the Government of West Bengal. He is also an MLA, elected from the Uluberia Dakshin constituency in the 2011 West Bengal state assembly election.

References 

State cabinet ministers of West Bengal
Living people
Year of birth missing (living people)